Rajya Sabha elections were held in 1960, to elect members of the Rajya Sabha, Indian Parliament's upper chamber.

Elections
Elections were held in 1960 to elect members from various states.
The list is incomplete.

Members elected
The following members are elected in the elections held in 1960. They are members for the term 1960-66 and retire in year 1966, except in case of the resignation or death before the term.

State - Member - Party

By-elections
The following by-elections were held in the year 1960.

State - Member - Party

 Andhra -  D Ramanuja Rao - INC - ( ele  16/06/1960 term till 1962 )
 Gujarat - K S Chavda - INC  ( ele  01/08/1960 term till 1966 )
 Gujarat - I T Lohani - INC  ( ele  01/08/1960 term till 1964 )
 Gujarat - Maganbhai S Patel - INC  ( ele  01/08/1960 term till 1962 )
 Maharashtra - B S Savnekar - INC  ( ele  28/06/1960 term till 1966 )
 Madras - R Gopalkrishnan - INC  ( ele  12/03/1960 term till 1964 )
 Madras - K Santhanam - INC  ( ele  18/04/1960 term till 1962 )
 Madhya Pradesh - A D Mani - INC  ( ele  22/12/1960 term till 1966 )
 Uttar Pradesh - Arjun Arora - INC  ( ele  01/08/1960 term till 1966 )
 Uttar Pradesh - A C Gilbert - INC  ( ele  10/11/1960 term till 1966 )

References

1960 elections in India
1960